Els Omells de na Gaia is a municipality in the comarca of the Urgell in Catalonia, Spain. It is located north of the Serra del Tallat, Catalan Pre-Coastal Range, at the southern end of the comarca.

The town centre has medieval stone houses. The Església parroquial de Santa Maria is an 18th-century church that houses some ancient carved wood images. Els Omells de na Gaia is in an economically depressed area, the main income is derived from cereal, vineyard and almond cultivation, as well as some cattle.

Demography

References

Mapa Topogràfic de Catalunya - Institut Cartogràfic de Catalunya

External links

Pàgina web de l'Ajuntament
 Government data pages 

Municipalities in Urgell
Populated places in Urgell